Camp Hancock may refer to:

Camp Hancock (Georgia)
Camp Hancock (Bismarck, North Dakota), a State Historic Site and listed on the National Register of Historic Places